Bewitched is an American fantasy sitcom television series that originally aired for eight seasons on ABC from September 17, 1964, to March 25, 1972. It is about a witch who marries an ordinary mortal man and vows to lead the life of a typical suburban housewife. The show was popular, finishing as the second-rated show in America during its debut season, staying in the top ten for its first three seasons, and ranking in eleventh place for both seasons four and five. The show continues to be seen throughout the world in syndication and on recorded media.

Bewitched was created by Sol Saks under executive producer Harry Ackerman and starred: Elizabeth Montgomery as Samantha Stephens; Dick York (1964–1969) as Darrin Stephens, her husband (Dick Sargent replaced an ailing York for the final three seasons, 1969–1972); Agnes Moorehead as Endora, Samantha's mother; David White as Larry Tate, Darrin's boss; Irene Vernon (1964–1966) and later Kasey Rogers (1966–1972) as Louise Tate, Larry's wife; Alice Pearce (1964–1966) as Gladys Kravitz; George Tobias (1964–1971) as her husband, Abner Kravitz; and Erin Murphy (1966–1972) as Tabitha Stephens (she shared this role for 18 episodes with her fraternal twin sister, Diane Murphy). In 1966, Sandra Gould took over the part of Gladys Kravitz (1966–1971) when Alice Pearce died. Annual semi-regulars included Maurice Evans as Maurice, Samantha's father; Marion Lorne as Samantha's Aunt Clara (1964–1968); Alice Ghostley as Esmeralda, Samantha's babysitter (1969–1972); Paul Lynde as Samantha's Uncle Arthur (1965–1971); Mabel Albertson as Darrin's mother, Phyllis Stephens (1964–1971); and Robert F. Simon and Roy Roberts alternating the role of Frank Stephens, Darrin's father (1964–1971).

Hanna-Barbera produced the opening and closing animation credits. In 2002, Bewitched was ranked No. 50 on "TV Guide's 50 Greatest TV Shows of All Time". In 1997, the same magazine ranked the season 2 episode "Divided He Falls" #48 on their list of the "100 Greatest Episodes of All Time".

Plot

A beautiful witch named Samantha (Elizabeth Montgomery) meets and marries a mortal named Darrin Stephens (originally Dick York, later Dick Sargent). While Samantha complies with Darrin's wishes to become a normal suburban housewife, her magical family disapproves of the mixed marriage and frequently interferes in the couple's lives. Episodes often begin with Darrin becoming the victim of a spell, the effects of which wreak havoc with mortals such as his boss, clients, parents, and neighbors. By the epilogue, however, Darrin and Samantha most often embrace, having overcome the devious elements that failed to separate them. The witches and their male counterparts, warlocks, are very long-lived; while Samantha appears to be a young woman, many episodes suggest she is actually hundreds of years old. To keep their society secret, witches avoid showing their powers in front of mortals other than Darrin. Nevertheless, the effects of their spells—and Samantha's attempts to hide their supernatural origin from mortals—drive the plot of most episodes. Witches and warlocks usually use physical gestures along with their incantations. To perform magic, Samantha often twitches her nose to create a spell. Special visual effects are accompanied by music to highlight such an action.

Setting
The main setting for most episodes is the Stephenses' home at 1164 Morning Glory Circle, in an upper-middle-class suburban neighborhood, either in Westport, Connecticut or Patterson, New York as indicated by conflicting information presented throughout the series. Many scenes also take place at the fictional Madison Avenue advertising agency McMann and Tate, where Darrin works.

Characters

 Elizabeth Montgomery as Samantha Stephens
 Dick York (seasons 1–5), Dick Sargent (season 6–8) as Darrin Stephens
 Agnes Moorehead as Endora
 David White (recurring in seasons 1–5, starring in seasons 6–8) as Larry Tate

During its run, the series had a number of major cast changes, often because of illness or death of the actors.

Precursors
Creator Sol Saks' inspirations for this series were the film I Married a Witch (1942), developed from Thorne Smith's unfinished novel The Passionate Witch, and the John Van Druten Broadway play Bell, Book and Candle, which was adapted into the 1958 film.

In I Married a Witch, Wallace Wooley (Fredric March) is a descendant of people who executed witches at the Salem witch trials. As revenge, a witch (Veronica Lake) prepares a love potion for him. She ends up consuming her own potion and falling for her enemy. Her father is against this union. In the film of Bell, Book and Candle, modern witch Gillian Holroyd (Kim Novak) uses a love spell on Shep Henderson (James Stewart) to have a simple fling with him but she genuinely falls for the man.

Both films were properties of Columbia Pictures, which also owned Screen Gems, the company that produced Bewitched.

Production and broadcasting

Sol Saks received credit as the creator of the show; he wrote the pilot of Bewitched but was not involved with the show after the pilot. Creator Saks, executive producer Harry Ackerman, and director William Asher started rehearsals for the pilot on November 22, 1963; this coincided with the assassination of John F. Kennedy. Asher felt personally affected by the event, as he knew Kennedy; he had produced the 1962 televised birthday party where Marilyn Monroe sang "Happy Birthday, Mr. President". The pilot concerned "the occult destabilization of the conformist life of an upwardly mobile advertising man". For that first episode, "I Darrin, Take This Witch, Samantha", Academy Award-winning actor José Ferrer served as the narrator. First season producer and head writer Danny Arnold set the initial style and tone of the series, and he also helped develop supporting characters such as Larry Tate and the Kravitzes. Arnold, who wrote on McHale's Navy and other shows, thought of Bewitched essentially as a romantic comedy about a mixed marriage; his episodes kept the magic element to a minimum. One or two magical acts drove the plot, but Samantha often solved problems without magic. Many of the first season's episodes were allegorical, using supernatural situations as metaphors for the problems any young couple would face. Arnold stated that the two main themes of the series were the conflict between a powerful woman and a husband who cannot deal with that power, and the anger of a bride's mother at seeing her daughter marry beneath her. Though the show was a hit right from the beginning, finishing its first year as the number 2 show in the United States, ABC wanted more magic and more farcical plots, causing battles between Arnold and the network.

In its first season, Bewitched was American Broadcasting Company's number one show and the best rated sitcom among all three networks, coming second in ratings only to Bonanza. Bewitched aired at 9 pm Thursday evenings. It was preceded on the air by another sitcom, My Three Sons, and followed by the soap opera Peyton Place. My Three Sons finished 13th in the ratings and Peyton Place ninth. The block formed by the three shows was the strongest ratings grabber in ABC's schedule. Arnold left the show after the first season, leaving producing duties to his friend Jerry Davis, who had already produced some of the first season's episodes (though Arnold was still supervising the writing). The second season was produced by Davis, and, with Bernard Slade as head writer, misunderstandings and farce became more prevalent elements, though this season still included a number of more low-key episodes in which the magical element was not strongly emphasized. With the third season and the switch to color, Davis left the show, and was replaced as producer by William Froug. Slade also left after the second season. According to William Froug's autobiography, William Asher (who had directed many episodes) wanted to take over as producer when Jerry Davis left, but the production company was not yet ready to approve the idea. Froug, a former producer of Gilligan's Island and the last season of The Twilight Zone, was brought in as a compromise. By his own admission, Froug was not very familiar with Bewitched and found himself in the uncomfortable position of being the official producer even though Asher was making most of the creative decisions. After a year, Froug left the show, and Asher took over as full-time producer of the series for the rest of its run. The first two seasons had aired Thursdays at 9:00, and the time was moved to 8:30 shortly after the third year (1966–1967) had begun. Nevertheless, the ratings for Bewitched remained high and it placed among the top fifteen shows through the 1968–69 season. It was the seventh highest-rated show in both the U.S. '65–'66 and '66–'67 schedules. Similarly, it was number 11 the following two years.

At the time, the show had won three Emmy Awards. William Asher won the Primetime Emmy Award for Outstanding Directing for a Comedy Series in 1966. Alice Pearce posthumously won the Primetime Emmy Award for Outstanding Supporting Actress in a Comedy Series for her portrayal of Gladys Kravitz and Marion Lorne won the same award posthumously in 1968 for her portrayal of Aunt Clara. Producers were faced with how to deal with the deaths of both these actresses. When Pearce died in early 1966, Mary Grace Canfield was hired to play Gladys's sister-in-law Harriet Kravitz in four episodes. Comedienne Alice Ghostley was approached to take over the role of Gladys the next season, but turned it down. She and Pearce were good friends so Ghostley decided to decline the role out of respect for Pearce. (from the 2020 online blog "Do You Remember?" article 'Here's What Happened to ‘Bewitched’ Actress Alice Pearce Before and After Playing “Mrs. Kravitz” ' in which Ed Gross interviews Bewitched author Herbie J. Pilato talking about Alice Ghostley being approached to replace Alice Pearce) In the fall of 1966, Sandra Gould was hired as Gladys Kravitz. Gould would remain with the show until the spring of 1971. After Marion Lorne's death in the spring of 1968, she was not replaced, and the character of Aunt Clara was not seen after the fourth season. Beginning in the show's sixth year, Alice Ghostley was finally used to play the character of Esmeralda, a kind but shy and inept witch who served as a nanny and nursemaid to Darrin and Samantha's children, Tabitha and Adam. (Ironically, Ghostley had appeared in a similar role as Naomi, an incompetent domestic, hired by Darrin to do housecleaning for a pregnant Samantha in the second-season episode "Maid To Order".) In another notable casting change, Louise Tate, played by Irene Vernon during the first two seasons, was played by Kasey Rogers thereafter.

The fifth season of Bewitched (1968-1969) proved to be a turning point for the series, most notably with the mid-season departure of Dick York and the record eight episodes which were filmed without him afterwards (although aired out of order with previously filmed episodes). York was suffering from recurring back problems, the result of an accident during the filming of They Came To Cordura (1959). As a result, many episodes in seasons three and four had York's character of Darrin out of town on business. Towards the end of the season five, York's increased disability, which had caused numerous shooting delays and script rewrites, resulted in his collapsing on the set in January 1969 while filming the episode "Daddy Does His Thing". He was immediately rushed to the hospital and after a long talk with producer-director William Asher, York decided to leave the series. At about the same time, Montgomery and Asher announced that they were expecting another baby and it was decided that Samantha and Darrin would also have another child in the fall of that year. On screen, Samantha tells Darrin over the phone the news of her second pregnancy in the fifth-season episode "Samantha's Good News". That same month, Dick Sargent was cast to play Darrin beginning in the sixth season. It was also during this season that Serena (Samantha's identical cousin, also played by Montgomery) was used more frequently. Filming of scenes involving both Samantha and Serena was accomplished by using Melody McCord, Montgomery's stand-in.

Beginning with the sixth season's (1969–1970) opening credits, in addition to York being replaced with Sargent, Elizabeth Montgomery was billed above the title, and David White now received billing as well, after Agnes Moorehead's. During this year, the show saw a significant decline in ratings, falling from eleventh to 24th place. In mid-1970, the set of the Stephenses' home was being rebuilt due to a fire. In June, the cast and crew traveled to Salem, Magnolia, and Gloucester, Massachusetts to film an eight-part story arc in which Samantha, Darrin, and Endora travel to Salem for the centennial Witches Convocation. These location shoots marked the only times the show would film away from its Hollywood studio sets and backlot. Season seven premiered with eight so-called 'Salem Saga' episodes. On June 15, 2005, TV Land unveiled a Samantha statue in Salem to mark the show's 40th anniversary. On hand were three surviving actors from the show, Bernard Fox (Dr. Bombay), Erin Murphy (Tabitha), and Kasey Rogers (Louise Tate), as well as producer/director William Asher.

These on-location episodes helped the show's sagging ratings. However, during that year, scripts from old episodes were recycled frequently. By the end of the 1970–1971 season, the ratings for Bewitched had noticeably dropped and the show did not even rank in the list of the top thirty programs. ABC moved Bewitcheds airtime from Thursdays at 8:30 pm to Wednesdays at 8:00 pm at the beginning of the eighth season. The schedule change did not help ratings as the show was now pitted against CBS's popular The Carol Burnett Show. Fewer recurring characters were used this season; the Kravitzes, Darrin's parents and Uncle Arthur did not appear at all, and Louise Tate only featured in three episodes. Filming ended in December 1971, and in January 1972 the show was finally moved to Saturday night at 8:00 pm, opposite television's number one show, All in the Family, where it fared even worse, with Bewitched finishing in 72nd place for the year.

During its first five seasons, Bewitched was sponsored by both General Motors’ Chevrolet division and the Quaker Oats Company. As a result, Chevrolet vehicles were often prominently featured on the series, even as a part of the storyline (an example of product placement), and there were many scenes of the Stephenses having breakfast in the kitchen. Sponsors in later seasons included Bristol-Myers, Eastman Kodak and Oscar Mayer.

Sets and locations
The 1959 Columbia Pictures film Gidget was filmed on location at a real house in Santa Monica (at 267 18th Street). The blueprint design of this house was later reversed and replicated as a house facade attached to an existing garage on the backlot of Columbia's Ranch. This was the house seen on Bewitched. The patio and living room sets seen in Columbia's Gidget Goes to Rome (1963) were soon adapted for the permanent Bewitched set for 1964. The interior of the Stephenses' house can be seen, substantially unaltered, in the Jerry Lewis film Hook, Line & Sinker (1969). The set was also used several times in the television series Gidget and I Dream of Jeannie, as well as the television film Brian's Song (1971). It was also used, as a setting for an opening tag sequence, for the final episode of the first season of another Screen Gems property, The Monkees and in an episode of The Fantastic Journey. The house served as Doctor Bellows' house on I Dream of Jeannie, and was seen in an episode of Home Improvement when Tim Taylor took Tool Time on location to the house of Vinnie's mother to repair a gas leak in the basement furnace (with a second gas leak at the kitchen stove, unbeknownst to Tim). The Stephens house was also featured in a Fruit of the Loom Christmas commercial and it was used as Clark Griswold's boyhood home in his old home movies in National Lampoon's Christmas Vacation. On Marvel Studios' 2021 limited series WandaVision, which pays homage to Bewitched in a number of episodes, the house's exterior serves throughout the series as the home of neighbor Agatha Harkness, while the interior set briefly appears in one episode as the ever-evolving home of the titular characters, Wanda and Vision.

On the Columbia studio backlot, the Kravitzes' house was actually down the street from the Stephenses' house exterior. Both houses' exterior doors opened to an unfinished  entry, as the interiors were shot on studio sound stages elsewhere. A "front porch" set, replicating the porch of the backlot house was created as well. From 1964 through 1966, the Kravitzes' house was the same as used for The Donna Reed Show. Beginning with season 3 color episodes in 1966, the Kravitz house sets were the same as what would (years later) be featured as The Partridge Family house.

Production and filming for Bewitched was based in Los Angeles and, although the setting is assumed to be New York, several episodes feature wide-angle exterior views of the Stephenses' neighborhood showing a California landscape with mountains in the distance. Another example of questionable continuity regarding the location can be seen in Season 6, Episode 6: Darrin's parents drive home after visiting the new baby, passing several large palm trees lining the street.

Cancellation and aftermath 

Despite the low ratings, Bewitched still had a contract for two more seasons on ABC. The network was willing to honor that contract by renewing the sitcom for a ninth season. However, by this time, Montgomery had grown tired of the series and wanted to move on to other roles. Also, she and her husband William Asher had separated and would divorce in 1974. As a consolation, Asher pitched an idea to ABC for a sitcom starring Paul Lynde. The concept was based on the play Howie, about a lawyer, Paul Simms (played by Lynde), whose daughter marries a slacker named Howard, or "Howie". The Lynde character despises him, as he is not interested in earning money or traditional pursuits. In creating a series for Paul Lynde, Asher decided to resurrect the Howie concept for ABC and Screen Gems as a replacement for Bewitched the following year. Asher designed The Paul Lynde Show to be ABC's counterpart to CBS's All In the Family; however, the show lacked the controversial and topical issues brought up by that series, due to ABC's restriction on social realism. This was despite Lynde's rewrite of the show's dialog in an effort to make the series more lively and comedic. When The Paul Lynde Show debuted on ABC in the fall of 1972, it inherited Bewitched’s time slot during its last season on Wednesday nights opposite the first half of the Top 30 hit The Carol Burnett Show on CBS and the Top 20 hit Adam-12 on NBC. While the first episode of The Paul Lynde Show did well in the ratings, strong negative reactions not only to Lynde's character but also the premise of the series led to bad word of mouth and, as the weeks went by, resulted in a collapse in viewership.

The show bore some similarities to Bewitched. Some of the sets used for the Simms' house and backyard were repurposed from Samantha and Darrin Stephens's home. The name of Paul's law firm McNish & Simms was very similar to the name of Darrin Stephens's advertising agency McMann & Tate. In addition, many actors regularly seen on Bewitched were also used on Lynde's series including Mabel Albertson, Herb Voland, Jack Collins, Richard X. Slattery, and Dick Wilson.

At the same time, to help fulfill the network's contract with Bewitched, Asher and Harry Ackerman created another ABC sitcom for the 1972–1973 season titled Temperatures Rising. The series starred James Whitmore and Cleavon Little. In its first year, the sitcom was not only struggling with its format but with ratings. In mid-season, Asher was replaced as producer by Bruce Johnson and Duke Vincent. Despite its challenges, the series ended its first year with a respectable 29 share and was renewed for the 1973–1974 season. To improve ratings and help Paul Lynde fulfill his contract with the network, ABC wanted to make some changes. When The New Temperatures Rising Show debuted in September 1973, Whitmore was replaced by Lynde and the emphasis on black comedy in the show became more prominent. As a result, the ratings for the series fell well below the levels of the previous season.

When Screen Gems head John Mitchell and ABC chief programmer Barry Diller noticed that The New Temperatures Rising Show was failing, they contacted William Asher and asked him to come back and salvage the series. As a result, the show was resurrected on July 18, 1974, after a six-month hiatus with its original title Temperatures Rising. Joining Lynde and Little in the cast was Bewitched alum Alice Ghostley. Despite the changes in cast and format, the attempt to resuscitate the series failed and ABC finally cancelled it permanently. The final episode of Temperatures Rising aired on August 29, 1974, which ended William Asher's original contract with Bewitched and ABC.

Cultural context
In February 1964, feminist Betty Friedan's two-part essay "Television and the Feminine Mystique" for TV Guide criticized the portrayal of women in television shows as simplistic, manipulative, and insecure household drudges whose time was spent dreaming of love and plotting revenge on their husbands. Samantha's character differed from this stereotype and Endora used Friedan-like language to criticize the boring drudgery of household life. Others have looked how the series 'play[ed] into and subvert[ed] a rich load of cultural stereotypes and allusions' regarding witches, gender roles, advertising and consumerism. In the episode "Eat at Mario's" (May 27, 1965), Samantha and Endora use their powers to defend and promote a quality Italian restaurant. They take delight in an active, aggressive role in the public space, breaking new ground in the depiction of women in television.

Airing during the civil rights era, Bewitched broached taboos about interracial marriage.

In a 1992 interview, Elizabeth Montgomery was asked if the show was an allegory about closeted homosexuality. She answered, "Don't think that didn't enter our minds at the time. We talked about it on the set—certainly not in production meetings—that this was about people not being allowed to be what they really are. If you think about it, Bewitched is about repression in general and all the frustration and trouble it can cause."

Reception
Walter Metz attributes the success of the series to its snappy writing, the charm of Elizabeth Montgomery, and the talents of its large supporting cast. The show also made use of respected film techniques for its special effects. The soundtrack was unique, notably where it concerned the synthesized sound of nose twitching.

The first episodes featured a voice-over narrator "performing comic sociological analyses" of the role of a witch in middle class suburbia. The style was reminiscent of Hollywood films such as Will Success Spoil Rock Hunter? (1957).
In a 1991 audio interview with film historian Ronald Haver, Elizabeth Montgomery revealed that her father Robert Montgomery was originally approached and asked to narrate these episodes but he refused. Instead, the narration was done by Academy Award-winning actor José Ferrer, who did not receive credit.

The series inspired the rival show I Dream of Jeannie (1965–1970) on NBC, which was produced by the same studio as Bewitched (Screen Gems).

Spin-offs, crossovers, and remakes

The Flintstones
The 1965 episode of The Flintstones titled "Samantha" (1965) featured Dick York and Elizabeth Montgomery as Darrin and Samantha Stephens, who have just moved into the neighborhood. This crossover was facilitated by both series being broadcast on ABC.

Tabitha and Adam and the Clown Family
An animated TV special made in 1972 by Hanna-Barbera Productions for The ABC Saturday Superstar Movie, this featured teenage versions of Tabitha and Adam visiting their aunt and her family who travel with a circus. The show aired on December 2, 1972.

Tabitha

In 1977, a short-lived spin-off titled Tabitha aired on ABC. Lisa Hartman played Tabitha, now an adult working with her brother Adam at television station KXLA. There were several continuity differences with the original series. Adam and Tabitha had both aged far more than the intervening five years between the two series would have allowed. Adam also had become Tabitha's older mortal brother, rather than her younger warlock brother, as he was in Bewitched. Supporting character Aunt Minerva (Karen Morrow) says she has been close to Tabitha since childhood, though she had never been mentioned once in the original series. Tabitha's parents are mentioned but never appear. However Bernard Fox, Sandra Gould, George Tobias and Dick Wilson reprised their roles as Dr. Bombay, Gladys Kravitz, Abner Kravitz, and "various drunks."

Passions

The 1999-2008 NBC soap opera Passions featured several appearances by Bernard Fox, playing Dr. Bombay. In another echo of Bewitched, the resident witch on Passions, Tabitha Lenox (Juliet Mills), named her daughter "Endora."

Theatrical movie

Bewitched inspired a 2005 film starring Nicole Kidman and Will Ferrell. This film was distributed by Columbia Pictures. The film, departing from the show's family-oriented tone, is not a remake but takes a metafictional approach, with the action focused on arrogant, failing Hollywood actor Jack Wyatt (Ferrell) who is offered a career comeback playing Darrin in a remake of Bewitched. The role is contingent upon him finding the perfect woman to play Samantha. He chooses an unknown named Isabel Bigelow (Kidman), who is an actual witch. The film was written, directed, and produced by Nora Ephron, and was poorly received by most critics and was a financial failure. It earned $22 million less than the production cost domestically. However it earned an additional $68 million internationally. The New York Times called the film "an unmitigated disaster."

Comic adaptations
Dell Comics adapted the series into a comic book series in 1964. The art work was provided by Henry Scarpelli.

In 1966, the series was adapted as a strip in Lady Penelope, beginning from issue 12 and lasting until the comic's demise in 1969.

Television remakes
 Argentina: A remake called Hechizada, produced by Telefé, aired in early 2007. It starred Florencia Peña as Samantha, Gustavo Garzón as her husband, Eduardo, and Georgina Barbarrosa as Endora. This show adapted original scripts to an Argentinian context, with local humor and a contemporary setting. The show was cancelled due to low ratings after a few weeks.
 Japan: TBS, a flagship station of Japan News Network, produced a remake called Okusama wa majo (奥さまは魔女, meaning "(My) Wife is a Witch"), also known as Bewitched in Tokyo. Eleven episodes were broadcast on JNN stations Fridays at 10 pm, from January 16 to March 26, 2004, and a special on December 21, 2004. The main character, Arisa Matsui, was portrayed by Ryoko Yonekura. Okusama wa majo is also the Japanese title for the original American series.
 India: In 2002, Sony Entertainment Television began airing Meri Biwi Wonderful a local adaptation of Bewitched.
 Russia: In 2009, TV3 broadcast a remake titled "Моя любимая ведьма" ("My Favorite Witch"), starring Anna Zdor as Nadia (Samantha), Ivan Grishanov, as Ivan (Darrin) and Marina Esepenko as Nadia's mother. The series is very similar to the original, with most episodes based on those from the original series. American comedy writer/producer Norm Gunzenhauser oversaw the writing and directing of the series.
 United Kingdom: In 2008, the BBC made a pilot episode of a British version, with Sheridan Smith as Samantha, Tom Price as Darrin, and veteran actress Frances de la Tour as Endora.

Proposed reboots
In August 2011, it was reported that CBS ordered a script to be written by Marc Lawrence for a rebooted series of Bewitched.

On October 22, 2014, Sony Pictures Television announced that it sold a pilot of Bewitched to NBC as a possible entry for the 2015—2016 US television season. This show would have concerned Tabitha's daughter Daphne, a single woman who despite having the same magical powers as her mother, grandmother, and great-grandmother, is determined not to use her special abilities to find a soul mate. The new version of the proposed series, written by Abby Kohn and Marc Silverstein, had been on the radar of several major networks, including ABC, after Sony began shopping the project to interested parties.

On August 23, 2018, ABC announced that it had bought a pilot for a single camera Bewitched remake from Black-ish creator Kenya Barris. This is Barris's last new project for the network before his exclusive contract with Netflix goes into effect.

WandaVision 

The second episode of drama-mystery television miniseries WandaVision, titled "Don't Touch That Dial", heavily references the series through an animated title sequence and the premise of Wanda Maximoff and Vision living an idyllic suburban life trying to conceal their true natures. Exteriors of the neighborhood were filmed at the now Warner Ranch Backlot with Maximoff's nosy neighbor Agnes living in the Stephens house.

Episodes

Episode availability

Syndication history
After completing its original run, ABC Daytime and ABC Saturday Morning continued to air the series until 1973. Since then, Bewitched has been syndicated on many local US broadcast stations, first from 1973 to 1982 and then since 1993, including Columbia TriStar Television as part of the Screen Gems Network syndication package from 1999 to 2001, which featured bonus wraparound content during episode airings in 1999.

From 1973 to 1982, the entire series was syndicated by Screen Gems/Columbia Pictures. By the late '70s, many local stations skipped the black and white episodes or they only ran them in the summer due to the perception that black-and-white shows usually had less appeal than shows which were filmed in color. From 1981 to about 1991, only the color episodes were syndicated in barter syndication by DFS Program Exchange. The first two seasons, which were in black and white, were not included because Columbia retained the rights to them. Beginning in 1989, Nick at Nite only aired the black-and-white episodes, which were originally unedited. The edited versions of the episodes continued in barter syndication until 1992. Columbia syndicated the entire series beginning in 1991. The remaining six color seasons were added to Nick at Nite's lineup in March 1998 in a week-long Dueling Darrins Marathon. Later, seasons 1–2 were colorized and made available for syndication. Eventually, they were made available for DVD sales. The cable television channel WTBS carried seasons 3–8 throughout the 1980s and 1990s from DFS on a barter basis like most local stations that carried the show.

The Hallmark Channel aired the show from 2001 to 2003; TV Land then aired the show from 2003 to 2006, and it returned to TV Land in March 2010, but left the schedule in 2012.

In October 2008, the show began to air on WGN America, and in October 2012, it began to air on Logo, limited to the middle seasons.

MeTV aired the show in conjunction with I Dream of Jeannie from December 31, 2012, to September 1, 2013. The cable and satellite network FETV also airs the show together with I Dream of Jeannie. The show now airs on Antenna TV and GAC Family.
The episodes on GAC Family air in HD and have been remastered.

Overseas markets
In Australia, this series aired on the Nine Network's digital channel GO! later it moved to the Seven Network's digital channels 7TWO later 7flix. Prior to this, the show aired in reruns on Network Ten in 1995 before moving to the Seven Network a year later.

In Italy, the series aired on Raiuno, Telemontecarlo, Italia 1, Rai 3, Canale 5, Retequattro, Boing & Paramount Network under the name Vita da strega (Life as a Witch) from 1967 until 1979.

The Russia-based channel Domashny aired the show from 2008 to 2010.

Internet
Selected episodes may be viewed on iTunes, YouTube, IMDb, Hulu, The Minisode Network, Crackle, and Amazon.com. The show also airs on free streaming TV station Pluto TV.

Home media

Beginning in 2005, Sony Pictures Home Entertainment released all eight seasons of Bewitched. In regions 1 and 4, seasons 1 and 2 were each released in two versions—one as originally broadcast in black-and-white, and one colorized. The complete series set only contains the colorized versions of Seasons 1–2. Only the colorized editions were released in regions 2 and 4.

On August 27, 2013, it was announced that Mill Creek Entertainment had acquired the rights to various television series from the Sony Pictures library including Bewitched. They have subsequently re-released the first six seasons, with seasons 1 & 2 available only in their black and white versions.

On October 6, 2015, Mill Creek Entertainment re-released Bewitched- The Complete Series on DVD in Region 1. Special features were stripped from the release. The first two seasons are in black and white only.

Notes

References

Sources

Further reading
 
 
 
 
 
 
 
 Spencer, Beth. "Samantha every witch way but lose." The Age, 25 June 2005.

External links

 

 
1964 American television series debuts
1972 American television series endings
1960s American sitcoms
1970s American sitcoms
American Broadcasting Company original programming
American romantic comedy television series
Black-and-white American television shows
English-language television shows
Dell Comics titles
American fantasy television series
Fantasy comedy television series
Fictional characters who can teleport
Television about magic
Television series about marriage
Television series by Sony Pictures Television
Television shows set in New York (state)
Television shows set in Connecticut
Television series about witchcraft
Television shows adapted into films
Television shows adapted into comics
Television series about advertising
Television series by Screen Gems